Assimilation is the process of absorption of vitamins, minerals, and other chemicals from food  as part of the nutrition of an organism. In humans, this is always done with a chemical breakdown (enzymes and acids) and physical breakdown (oral mastication and stomach churning). The second process of bio assimilation is the chemical alteration of substances in the bloodstream by the liver or cellular secretions. Although a few similar compounds can be absorbed in digestion bio assimilation, the bioavailability of many compounds is dictated by this second process since both the liver and cellular secretions can be very specific in their metabolic action (see chirality). This second process is where the absorbed food reaches the cells via the liver.

Most foods are composed of largely indigestible components depending on the enzymes and effectiveness of an animal's digestive tract.  The most well-known of these indigestible compounds is cellulose; the basic chemical polymer in the makeup of plant cell walls.  Most animals, however, do not produce cellulase; the enzyme needed to digest cellulose.  However some animal and  species have developed symbiotic relationships with cellulase-producing bacteria (see termites and metamonads.) This allows termites to use the energy-dense cellulose carbohydrate.  Other such enzymes are known to significantly improve bio-assimilation of nutrients. Because of the use of bacterial derivatives, enzymatic dietary supplements now contain such enzymes as amylase, glucoamylase, protease, invertase, peptidase, lipase, lactase, phytase, and cellulase.

Examples of biological assimilation 
 Photosynthesis, a process whereby carbon dioxide and water are transformed into a number of organic molecules in plant cells.
 Nitrogen fixation from the soil into organic molecules by symbiotic bacteria which live in the roots of certain plants, such as Leguminosae.
 Magnesium supplements orotate, oxide, sulfate, citrate, and glycerate are all structurally similar. However, oxide and sulfate are not water-soluble and do not enter the blood stream, while orotate and glycerate have normal exiguous liver conversion. Chlorophyll sources or magnesium citrate are highly bioassimilable.
 The absorption of nutrients into the body after digestion in the intestine and its transformation in biological tissues and fluids.

See also 
 Anabolism
 Biochemistry
 Nutrition
 Respiration
 Transportation
 Excretion

References 

Biological processes
Metabolism